In British politics, the Shadow Financial Secretary to the Treasury (or colloquially Shadow Financial Secretary) is a shadow ministerial position of the Official Opposition that acts as the primary opposition to the equivalent position Financial Secretary to the Treasury, a government minister in HM Treasury. The position is currently held by James Murray.

Office-holders 
Former office holders include:

Stuart Holland (1987-1989)
 Sir Oliver Letwin (23 July 1999 - 10 January 2000)
 Sir David Lidington  (8 October 2001 - 1 October 2002)
 Sir Stephen O'Brien (1 June 2002 - 30 June 2002)
 Mark Prisk (1 June 2002 - 1 June 2003)
 Andrew Tyrie (11 November 2003 - 15 March 2004)

References 

Official Opposition (United Kingdom)